Ernie Wyre Nevel (August 17, 1918 – July 10, 1988) was an American Major League Baseball pitcher who played in  and  with the New York Yankees and in  with the Cincinnati Redlegs.

Nevel had a 0–1 record, with a 6.10 ERA, in 14 games pitched as a big leaguer. In  innings pitched, he allowed 27 hits and eight bases on balls, with nine strikeouts to his credit. Of his 14 appearances, one came as a starting pitcher. With the Yankees having already clinched the 1950 American League pennant, Nevel started the final game of the regular season on Sunday, October 1, against the third-place Boston Red Sox at Fenway Park.  He allowed four hits and four earned runs in three innings of work, and took the loss, his only decision in Major League Baseball.  On August 28, 1952, while he was on the roster of the Triple-A Kansas City Blues, he was one of four players (and $35,000 in cash) shipped to Cincinnati for former star hurler Ewell Blackwell, acquired by the Yankees for the pennant drive.

Twenty-six years old when he first broke into professional baseball, Nevel concluded a nine-year pro career in 1954.  He died in Springfield, Missouri, at the age of 69.

References

External links

1918 births
1988 deaths
Augusta Tigers players
Baseball players from Missouri
Beaumont Exporters players
Beaumont Roughnecks players
Buffalo Bisons (minor league) players
Cincinnati Redlegs players
Kansas City Blues (baseball) players
Major League Baseball pitchers
Miami Tourists players
New York Yankees players
People from Charleston, Missouri
Quincy Gems players
St. Paul Saints (AA) players